Ischiocentra punctata is a species of beetle in the family Cerambycidae. It was described by Martins and Galileo in 2005. It is known from Colombia.

References

Onciderini
Beetles described in 2005